The molecular configuration of a molecule is the permanent geometry that results from the spatial arrangement of its bonds.  The ability of the same set of atoms to form two or more molecules with different configurations is stereoisomerism. This is distinct from constitutional isomerism which arises from atoms being connected in a different order. Conformers arising from single bond rotations, if not isolable as atropisomers, do not count as distinct molecular configurations.  

Enantiomers are molecules having one or more chiral centers that are mirror images of each other. Diastereomers are distinct molecular configurations that are a broader category.

Used as drugs, compounds with different configuration normally have different physiological activity, including the desired pharmacological effect, the toxicology and the metabolism.

See also 
 Absolute configuration

References

External links 
 The IUPAC definition of "configuration"

Molecules
Stereochemistry

ja:立体配置